The Patient in Room 18 is a 1929 mystery novel written by Mignon G. Eberhart. Eberhart's first published novel, it follows the adventures of Nurse Sarah Keate, who would later appear in six more of Eberhart's works, and became one of the most popular mystery characters of the time. The novel later served as the basis for a 1938 motion picture released by Warner Brothers, with the same title, starring Patric Knowles and Ann Sheridan.

References 

American thriller novels
1929 American novels
American novels adapted into films
Novels by Mignon G. Eberhart
Doubleday, Doran books
Novels set in hospitals